Carbochironomus is a genus of European non-biting midges in the subfamily Chironominae of the bloodworm family Chironomidae.

Species
C. improvisus Reiss & Kirschbaum, 1990

References

Chironomidae
Nematocera genera